Muthumariamman Temple is situated at Tiruvappur in Thirukokarnam, at a distance of 5 kilometres from Pudukkottai in Tamil Nadu, India.

Structure
The presiding deity, Muthumariamman, is found in sitting posture. The temple has front mandapa followed by Dwajasthambam, bali peetam and sanctum sanctorum. In the prakara, Meenakshi of Madurai and Kamatchi of Kanchipuram are found.

Festivals
Aadi Fridays are famous in this temple. During Tamil month of Masi showering of flowers and car festival are held. In the Sundays of Tamil  month of Avani special worship is held.

Worship time
The temple is opened for worship from 6.00 to 10.00 a.m. and 5.00 to 8.00 p.m.

References

External links
திருவப்பூர் முத்துமாரியம்மன் கோயிலில் பூச்சொரிதல் விழா, தினமலர், பிப்ரவரி 23, 2015
திருவப்பூர் முத்துமாரியம்மன் கோவில் தேரோட்டம், தினமலர், மார்ச் 10, 2015

 Hindu temples in Pudukkottai district